Laemmle Theatres is a group of family-run arthouse movie theaters in the Los Angeles area. It was established in 1938 and is owned and operated by Robert Laemmle and his son Greg Laemmle.

Robert Laemmle's father Max and uncle Kurt, cousins of Universal Pictures founder Carl Laemmle, bought their first movie theater in the Highland Park neighborhood of Los Angeles in 1938.

There are eight locations:
Claremont 5 in Claremont,
Glendale 5 in Glendale,
Monica 4-plex in Santa Monica,
Playhouse 7 in Pasadena,
Royal Theatre in West Los Angeles,
Town Center 5 in Encino,
NoHo 7 in North Hollywood,
and Laemmle Theatres 7 in Santa Clarita.
The Laemmle Grande 4-Plex on South Figueroa Street closed October 25, 2009 as L.A. Live's Regal Cinema complex was set to open. Construction of the Santa Clarita theater was completed in 2020, but its opening was delayed due to the COVID-19 pandemic. It opened on April 9, 2021.

In December 2011, the Glendale City Council and Redevelopment Agency approved a $12.8 million plan to develop a loft with 42 residential units, a 5-screen Laemmle Theaters, and a Panda Inn restaurant. Construction of the residential building complex began in mid-2015, and it opened in August of 2018. With the Glendale location's reopening on May 21, 2021, Laemmle Theatres will be operating all of the locations that had been open in 2019 prior to the closures caused by the COVID-19 pandemic.

Oscar qualifying
During the 21st century, the Laemmle venues have come to be known as the "Secret Path to Oscar Qualifying" since they have been repeatedly used by independent films, short films, and documentaries for that purpose.  Laemmle provides services designed to enable a film to qualify for Academy Awards, charging a flat rate for exhibition while giving the film's producers 100 percent of the box office receipts; they have someone meet every year with the Academy committees in all the categories to ensure their "qualifying run" bookings actually qualify.  They even help film-makers book their films outside of their own theaters if a committee requires that.

References

External links
 
Growing up Laemmle

Cinemas and movie theaters in Los Angeles
Movie theatre chains in the United States
Theatres in Los Angeles County, California
Cinema of Southern California
Companies based in Los Angeles
Entertainment companies established in 1938
Mass media companies established in 1938
1938 establishments in California